The AARP Movies for Grownups Award for Best Intergenerational Film is one of the AARP Movies for Grownups Awards presented annually by AARP the Magazine. The award honors the film with the best portrayal of relationships between people of different ages. The award for Best Intergenerational Film was first given in 2003, when the awards expanded beyond their initial four categories of Best Movie for Grownups, Best Director, Best Actor, and Best Actress.

Winners and Nominees

2000s

2010s

2020s

References

Intergenerational Film